Fatih Yiğituşağı (born 23 November 1983) is a professional Turkish former footballer. He made his debut in the Fußball-Bundesliga on 22 November 2008 for Hannover 96 in a 4–0 away loss at Eintracht Frankfurt.

References

External links 
 

1983 births
Living people
People from Germersheim (district)
Turkish footballers
Association football forwards
Bundesliga players
3. Liga players
SV Yeşilyurt players
Türkiyemspor Berlin players
FC Erzgebirge Aue players
Hannover 96 players
Hannover 96 II players
Tennis Borussia Berlin players
Berliner AK 07 players
Samsunspor footballers
Footballers from Rhineland-Palatinate
FC Viktoria 1889 Berlin players
TFF Second League players